Mirjam Ernestus (born 1969) is professor of psycholinguistics and scientific director of the Centre for Language Studies at Radboud University Nijmegen in the Netherlands.

Biography
Ernestus studied at the Vrije Universiteit Amsterdam from 1987 to 2000, initially for a year in French linguistics and literature, then for a year in chemistry and pharmaceutical sciences, before graduating cum laude with a BA/MA in general linguistics in 1994. Her PhD was awarded in 2000.

Subsequently, Ernestus worked as a postdoctoral researcher at the Max Planck Institute for Psycholinguistics in Nijmegen from 2000 to 2006 and at the Radboud University from 2003. In 2007 she was appointed associate professor of psycholinguistics, and in 2012 she was promoted to full professor. Since 2017 she has also been the scientific director of the university's Centre for Language Studies. In addition, she acted as editor of the journal Laboratory Phonology from 2015 to 2021, and since 2021 has been chair of the editorial board of Radboud University Press.

Ernestus has been the recipient of significant honours and awards, including membership of the Royal Netherlands Academy of Arts and Sciences (since 2015) and the Academia Europaea (since 2022). In 2011 she was awarded an ERC Starting Grant with the title The challenge of reduced pronunciation variants in conversational speech for foreign language listeners: experimental research and computational modeling.

Research
Ernestus's work is in the fields of laboratory phonology, psycholinguistics and phonetics, with the production and perception of informal, spontaneous conversational speech – including in second language acquisition – forming the main focus of her research. She has also worked with Harald Baayen on the processing of complex morphology.

Selected publications
 Ernestus, Mirjam. 2000. Voice assimilation and segment reduction in casual Dutch, a corpus-based study of the phonology-phonetics interface. Ph.D. dissertation, Vrije Universiteit Amsterdam. 
 Ernestus, Mirjam, R. Harald Baayen, and Rob Schreuder. 2002. The recognition of reduced word forms. Brain and Language 81 (1–3), 162–173. 
 Ernestus, Mirjam, and R. Harald Baayen. 2003. Predicting the unpredictable: Interpreting neutralized segments in Dutch. Language 79 (1), 5–38. 
 Pluymaekers, Mark, Mirjam Ernestus, and R. Harald Baayen. 2005. Lexical frequency and acoustic reduction in spoken Dutch. Journal of the Acoustical Society of America 118 (4), 2561–2569. 
 Mitterer, Holger, and Mirjam Ernestus. 2008. The link between speech perception and production is phonological and abstract: Evidence from the shadowing task. Cognition 109 (1), 168–173. 
 Ernestus, Mirjam. 2014. Acoustic reduction and the roles of abstractions and exemplars in speech processing. Lingua 142, 27–41.

References

1969 births
Women linguists
Psycholinguists
Phonologists
Speech perception researchers
Speech production researchers
Living people
Academic staff of Radboud University Nijmegen
Vrije Universiteit Amsterdam alumni